Sirtuins are a family of signaling proteins involved in metabolic regulation. They are ancient in animal evolution and appear to possess a highly conserved structure throughout all kingdoms of life. Chemically, sirtuins are a class of proteins that possess either mono-ADP-ribosyltransferase or deacylase activity, including deacetylase, desuccinylase, demalonylase, demyristoylase and depalmitoylase activity. The name Sir2 comes from the yeast gene 'silent mating-type information regulation 2', the gene responsible for cellular regulation in yeast.

From in vitro studies, sirtuins are implicated in influencing cellular processes like aging, transcription, apoptosis, inflammation and stress resistance, as well as energy efficiency and alertness during low-calorie situations. As of 2018, there was no clinical evidence that sirtuins affect human aging.

Yeast Sir2 and some, but not all, sirtuins are protein deacetylases. Unlike other known protein deacetylases, which simply hydrolyze acetyl-lysine residues, the sirtuin-mediated deacetylation reaction couples lysine deacetylation to NAD+ hydrolysis. This hydrolysis yields O-acetyl-ADP-ribose, the deacetylated substrate and nicotinamide, which is an inhibitor of sirtuin activity itself. These proteins utilize NAD+ to maintain cellular health and turn NAD+ to nicotinamide (NAM). The dependence of sirtuins on NAD+ links their enzymatic activity directly to the energy status of the cell via the cellular NAD+:NADH ratio, the absolute levels of NAD+, NADH or NAM or a combination of these variables.

Sirtuins that deacetylate histones are structurally and mechanistically distinct from other classes of histone deacetylases (classes I, IIA, IIB and IV), which have a different protein fold and use Zn2+ as a cofactor.

Actions and species distribution 
Sirtuins are a family of signaling proteins involved in metabolic regulation. They are ancient in animal evolution and appear to possess a highly conserved structure throughout all kingdoms of life. Whereas bacteria and archaea encode either one or two sirtuins, eukaryotes encode several sirtuins in their genomes. In yeast, roundworms, and fruitflies, sir2 is the name of one of the sirtuin-type proteins (see table below).  Mammals possess seven sirtuins (SIRT1–7) that occupy different subcellular compartments: SIRT1, SIRT6 and SIRT7 are predominantly in the nucleus, SIRT2 in the cytoplasm, and SIRT3, SIRT4 and SIRT5 in the mitochondria.

History 
Research on sirtuin protein was started in 1991 by Leonard Guarente of MIT. Interest in the metabolism of NAD heightened after the year 2000 discovery by Shin-ichiro Imai and coworkers in the Guarente laboratory that sirtuins are NAD+-dependent protein deacetylases .

Types 

The first sirtuin was identified in yeast (a lower eukaryote) and named sir2. In more complex mammals, there are seven known enzymes that act in cellular regulation, as sir2 does in yeast. These genes are designated as belonging to different classes (I-IV), depending on their amino acid sequence structure. Several gram positive prokaryotes as well as the gram negative hyperthermophilic bacterium Thermotoga maritima possess sirtuins that are intermediate in sequence between classes, and these are placed in the "undifferentiated" or "U" class. In addition, several Gram positive bacteria, including Staphylococcus aureus and Streptococcus pyogenes, as well as several fungi carry macrodomain-linked sirtuins (termed "class M" sirtuins).

SIRT3, a mitochondrial protein deacetylase, plays a role in the regulation of multiple metabolic proteins like isocitrate dehydrogenase of the TCA cycle. It also plays a role in skeletal muscle as a metabolic adaptive response. Since glutamine is a source of a-ketoglutarate used to replenish the TCA cycle, SIRT4 is involved in glutamine metabolism.

Ageing 
Although preliminary studies with resveratrol, an activator of deacetylases such as SIRT1, led some scientists to speculate that resveratrol may extend lifespan, there was no clinical evidence for such an effect, as of 2018.

Tissue fibrosis

A 2018 review indicated that SIRT levels are lower in tissues from people with scleroderma, and such reduced SIRT levels may increase risk of fibrosis through modulation of the TGF-β signaling pathway.

DNA repair
SIRT1, SIRT6 and SIRT7 proteins are employed in DNA repair.  SIRT1 protein promotes homologous recombination in human cells and is involved in recombinational repair of DNA breaks.

SIRT6 is a chromatin-associated protein and in mammalian cells is required for base excision repair of DNA damage.  SIRT6 deficiency in mice leads to a degenerative aging-like phenotype.   In addition, SIRT6 promotes the repair of DNA double-strand breaks.  Furthermore, over-expression of SIRT6 can stimulate homologous recombinational repair.

SIRT7 knockout mice display features of premature aging.  SIRT7 protein is required for repair of double-strand breaks by non-homologous end joining.

Inhibitors 

Certain sirtuin activity is inhibited by nicotinamide, which binds to a specific receptor site. It is an inhibitor in vitro of SIRT1, but can be a stiumlator in cells.

Activators

See also 
 Biological immortality
 Histone deacetylases or HDACs
 Trichostatin A

References

External links 
 

Enzymes
Aging-related enzymes
Aging-related proteins